Kulim-Bandar Baharu is a federal constituency in Kulim District and Bandar Baharu District, Kedah, Malaysia, that has been represented in the Dewan Rakyat since 1959.

The federal constituency was created in the 1958 redistribution and is mandated to return a single member to the Dewan Rakyat under the first past the post voting system. This is only constituency was named after two towns named Kulim and Bandar Baharu and still used today.

Demographics

History

Polling districts
According to the federal gazette issued on 31 October 2022, the Kulim-Bandar Baharu constituency is divided into 41 polling districts.

Representation history

State constituency

Current state assembly members

Local governemnts

Election results

References

Kedah federal constituencies
Constituencies established in 1958